P2PSP (Peer to Peer Straightforward Protocol) is a communication protocol of the application layer for streaming multimedia content on the Internet, that is, where users play the stream in sync. This can be used to build a variety of live broadcasting services ranging from small meetings to large systems IPTV. Unlike traditional CS (Client-Server) and CDN (Content Delivery Network) based video streaming, P2P contributes its upstream bandwidth to the system. Therefore, in general, P2P systems are more scalable architectures based on the model client-server. This protocol helps in reducing the bandwidth usage of the source of the broadcast by using the upload bandwidth of the peers connected to the source.

The P2PSP has been specially defined for streaming live footage. Thus, it can be transmitted through a communications network based on packet switching an event that is occurring at that time, in the same way you can already created or recorded events.

Architecture
P2PSP is a hybrid structure of Mesh Network in which every peer is connected to each other and
Star Network where there are some sources and every peer is connected to one of the server directly.
A pure P2PSP overlay lies in one extreme where there is just one server and every peer is connected
to each other. One part of the media is sent to each of the peer which in turn sends that part
to all other peers connected in the network. The other extreme is where a large group of P2PSP
teams are connected to each other in a star structure which results in requirement of more upload bandwidth from the source since the same packet will be transmitted more than one time from single/multiple sources of broadcast.

Key Features
 Independent of broadcast content, bit-rate, format, resolution etc.
 Can be used for broadcasting content in local area network.
 Peers can be hosted in private networks, even if they are behind NATs.
 The basic module is very simple, which allows it to be run on less powerful systems.

References

Internet protocols